83rd NBR Awards
Best Film:
Hugo

The 83rd National Board of Review Awards, honoring the best in film for 2011.

Top 10 Films
Films listed alphabetically except top, which is ranked as Best Film of the Year:

Hugo
The Artist
The Descendants
Drive
The Girl with the Dragon Tattoo
Harry Potter and the Deathly Hallows – Part 2
The Ides of March
J. Edgar
The Tree of Life
War Horse

Top Foreign Films 
13 Assassins
Elite Squad: The Enemy Within
Footnote
Le Havre
Point Blank

Top Documentaries 
Born to Be Wild
Buck
George Harrison: Living in the Material World
Project Nim
Senna

Top Independent Films 
50/50
Another Earth
Beginners
A Better Life
Cedar Rapids
Margin Call
Shame
Take Shelter
We Need To Talk About Kevin
Win Win

Winners

Best Film:
Hugo
Best Director:
Martin Scorsese, Hugo
Best Actor:
George Clooney, The Descendants
Best Actress:
Tilda Swinton, We Need to Talk About Kevin
Best Supporting Actor:
Christopher Plummer, Beginners
Best Supporting Actress:
Shailene Woodley, The Descendants
Best Foreign Film:
A Separation
Best Documentary:
Paradise Lost 3: Purgatory
Best Animated Feature:
Rango
Best Ensemble Cast:
The Help
Breakthrough Performance:
Felicity Jones, Like Crazy
Rooney Mara, The Girl with the Dragon Tattoo
Spotlight Award:
Michael Fassbender, A Dangerous Method, Jane Eyre, Shame, X-Men: First Class
Spotlight Award for Best Directorial Debut:
J. C. Chandor, Margin Call
Best Original Screenplay:
Will Reiser, 50/50
Best Adapted Screenplay:
Nat Faxon & Alexander Payne & Jim Rash, The Descendants
Special Filmmaking Achievement Award:
The Harry Potter franchise, for "a distinguished translation from Book to Film"
NBR Freedom of Expression:
Crime After Crime
Pariah

National Board of Review Awards
2011 film awards
2011 in American cinema